P. densifolia may refer to:

 Pinanga densifolia, a flowering plant
 Pultenaea densifolia, a bush pea